Lomographa guttalata is a moth in the family Geometridae first described by Katsumi Yazaki in 1994. It is found in Taiwan and northern Yunnan in China.

The wingspan is 29–31 mm.

References

Moths described in 1994
Lomographa
Moths of Taiwan
Moths of Asia